Yahong Zheng from the Missouri University of Science and Technology, Rolla, MI was named Fellow of the Institute of Electrical and Electronics Engineers (IEEE) in 2015 for contributions to channel modeling and equalization for wireless communications.

References 

Fellow Members of the IEEE
Living people
Missouri University of Science and Technology faculty
21st-century American engineers
Year of birth missing (living people)